The River Dove is a river in North Yorkshire, England.  It rises on the North York Moors and flows south to join the River Rye, itself a tributary of the River Derwent. The upper valley of the river is known as Farndale. The name is of Brittonic Celtic origin, meaning "dark river". Its principal tributary is the Hodge Beck.

Course

The river flows through Farndale south-east past several small settlements to Church Houses. Here it turns south and continues meandering past Low Mill to Lowna. At Gillamoor it heads south-east again past Hutton-le-Hole before returning southwards past Ravenswick and to the east of Kirkbymoorside. It continues past Keldholme and Kirkby Mills to Great Edstone. From there it flows south south-east to where it joins the River Rye in the Vale of Pickering near the village of Salton.

The record high level shows the river can be susceptible to flooding.

Geography

Both the River Dove and Hodge Beck are partly swallowed by the local limestone aquifer and issue again further down the valley. During summer months the bed of Hodge Beck often runs dry. The soil in the valley floor is loam over clay. The bedrock is Jurassic limestone with some sandstone.

Leisure

Between Church Houses and Low Mill in Farndale, the River Dove is popular with walkers due to its picturesque setting. The banks of the river are known for their wild daffodils which are rumoured to have been planted by monks from nearby Rievaulx Abbey. Along this part of the valley is The Farndale Daffodil Walk, an  circular walk starting at Lowna Bridge.

In literature
William Wordsworth's poem, She dwelt among the untrodden ways from the Lucy series of poems refers to the eponymous Lucy living close to the "springs of Dove", a possible reference to the source of the river, but could equally pertain to the either the River Dove in Derbyshire or in Westmorland, as Wordsworth knew of all three of them.

Lists

Tributaries

 Middle Heads
 Gill Beck
 Gill Dike
 Oak Beck
 Low Dike
 Green Slack Dike
 Fish Beck
 West Gill Beck
 Lapa Green Dike
 Yealand Rigg Slack
 Shortsha Beck
 Hodge Beck
 Carr Dike

Settlements

 Church Houses
 Low Mill
 Lowna
 Gillamoor
 Hutton-le-Hole
 Ravenswick
 Kirkbymoorside
 Keldholme
 Kirkby Mills
 Great Edstone
 Salton

Crossings

 Thorn Wath Bridge, Church Houses
 Mill Bridge (foot)
 Waste Bridge, Low Mill
 Mercer's Bridge (foot)
 Dale End Bridge (foot)
 Birch Hagg Bridge
 Lowna Bridge, Lowna
 Yoadwath Ford
 Unnamed road, Ravenswick
 Keldholme Bridge, Keldholme
 A170, Kirkbymoorside
 Unnamed road near Salton

Gallery

Sources

 Ordnance Survey Explorer Map OL26
 Google Earth

References

External links

Rivers of North Yorkshire